Frederick Palmer may refer to:
Frederick Palmer (engineer) (1860–1934), British civil engineer
Frederick Palmer (journalist) (1873–1958), American writer and war correspondent
Frederick William Palmer (1891–1955), World War I Victoria Cross recipient
Frederick Christian Palmer (1866–1941), photographer
Frederick F. Palmer (1925–1992), U.S. Navy admiral
Frederick John Palmer, English photographer
F. W. J. Palmer (1864–1947), English civil engineer, structural engineer and surveyor